Mangola may be,

Mang'ola, Tanzania
Duke's Mangola drink